Vārkava Municipality is a former municipality in Latgale, Latvia. The municipality was formed in 2002 by merging Rožkalni Parish and Upmala Parish. In 2009 it absorbed Vārkava Parish, too; the administrative centre being Vecvārkava. The population in 2020 was 1,793.

On 1 July 2021, Vārkava Municipality ceased to exist and its territory was merged into Preiļi Municipality.

See also 
 Administrative divisions of Latvia (2009)

References 

 
Former municipalities of Latvia